Know Your Sport is an Irish sports quiz show produced by RTÉ between 8 October 1987 and 1 April 1998. The show was presented by George Hamilton and featured Jimmy Magee and Mary Hogan as scorekeeper.

Rounds of questions included the "specialist subject", "great moment in sport", "mystery guest" and "buzzer" rounds.

In 2009 an appeal to re-introduce the show to RTÉ's schedule gathered support on networking website, Facebook.

Was on RTE Player September 2017 to tributes for the death of Jimmy Magee again from Christmas 2021 to celebrate 60 years of television.

References

1980s Irish television series
1987 Irish television series debuts
1990s Irish television series
1998 Irish television series endings
Irish quiz shows
Irish sports television series
RTÉ original programming